Kirchberg (German for "Church Hill") commonly refers to:

Kirchberg, Luxembourg, a quarter of Luxembourg City, Luxembourg
Court of Justice of the European Union (metonym)

Kirchberg may also refer to:

Austria
Kirchberg am Wagram, a town in Lower Austria
Kirchberg am Walde, a town in Lower Austria
Kirchberg am Wechsel, a town in Lower Austria
Kirchberg an der Pielach, a town in Lower Austria
Kirchberg an der Raab, a town in Styria
Kirchberg in Tirol, a town in Tyrol
Kirchberg bei Mattighofen, a town in Upper Austria
Kirchberg ob der Donau, a town in Upper Austria
Kirchberg-Thening, a municipality in Upper Austria
Kirchberg (Fontanella), a subdivision of Fontanella, Austria in Vorarlberg

France
Kirchberg, Haut-Rhin

Germany
Kirchberg an der Iller, in Biberach,  Baden-Württemberg
Kirchberg an der Murr, in Rems-Murr, Baden-Württemberg
Kirchberg, a borough of Sulz am Neckar in Rottweil, Baden-Württemberg
Kirchberg convent, a monastery in Sulz am Neckar, Baden-Wuerttemberg
Kirchberg an der Jagst, in Schwäbisch Hall, Baden-Württemberg
Kirchberg, Upper Bavaria, in the Erding, Bavaria
Kirchberg im Wald, in Regen, Bavaria
Kirchberg (Bensheim), a mountain in Bergstraße, Hesse
Kirchberg, Rhein-Hunsrück, in Rhein-Hunsrück, Rhineland-Palatinate
Kirchberg (Verbandsgemeinde)
Kirchberg, Saxony, in Zwickau, Saxony
Kirchberg, fictional town in Erich Kästner's The Flying Classroom

Romania
Kirchberg or Chirpăr, a commune in Sibiu County

Switzerland
Kirchberg, Aargau, birthplace of Edmund Landolt
Kirchberg, Bern, a municipality in Emmental, Bern
Kirchberg, St. Gallen, a municipality Toggenburg, St. Gallen

United States
Kirchberg (Pennsylvania), a mountain

See also
Kilchberg (disambiguation)